National Media Centre (also known as National Press Centre) is the media centre of Ministry of Information and Broadcasting, Government of India. Its situated on Raisina Road in Central Delhi, close to the Rashtrapati Bhawan and Sansad Bhavan (Parliament House) and important ministries. The foundation ceremony for it was done in 2001. It was inaugurated in 2013. It houses the Press Information Bureau (PIB) and publicity offices of the ministry. It was modeled on media centres in Washington and Tokyo and other capitals.

History
Prime Minister Atal Bihari Vajpayee laid the foundation and performed the bhoomi poojan on 5 December 2001 for the National Press Centre as it was named then.

The Building
The centre is built on a 1.95-acre plot. The glass facade building consists of four floors with a hall for press conferences that can seat 283 people, a briefing room with 60-person capacity, 24 workstations. It has all modern communication needs. It also has a library, lounge and cafeteria. The press conference hall and media lounge have Wi-Fi access.

References

External links
 Press Information Bureau, Official website

Buildings and structures in New Delhi
Mass media in India
Government buildings in Delhi
News media in India
Government buildings completed in 2013
Ministry of Information and Broadcasting (India)